Harikesanallur Muthiah Bhagavatar (15 November 1877 – 30 June 1945), commonly known as Muthiah Bhagavatar, is one of Carnatic classical music's famous twentieth-century composers. He also created about 20 ragas.

Early life
Muthiah was born on 15 November 1877, in Harikesanallur, a small village in the Tirunelveli district of British India, into an affluent Brahmin Tamil family. He was exposed to music from a very early age, as his father was a patron of musicians. He lost his father at the young age of six years, when his maternal uncle M. Lakshmana Suri took over the responsibility for his education, initiating Muthiah into Sanskrit and Vedic studies. However, the love of music that had been implanted in him led Muthiah to leave his hometown of Harikesanallur, Tamil Nadu when he was only ten years in search of a teacher. He found the gifted teacher Padinaindumandapa Sambasiva Iyer at Tiruvarur, who recognised Muthiah's talent for music. Sambasiva Iyer was the father of T.S Sabesa Iyer, a contemporary who also went on to win the prestigious Sangeetha Kalanidhi award from the Madras Music Academy in 1934. During the nine years he spent with Sambasiva Iyer, Muthiah cultivated this talent and made his name as a Harikata Vidhwan. His rich voice and excellent tanam singing made him one of the era's most highly coveted concert artists. He was Asthana vidvan in seithur zamin and first guru of M S Subbulakshmi. His cousin Venkatarama Iyer was a Supreme Court Judge as well as recipient of Sangeet Kalanidhi award in 1944.

Composer
He has to his credit almost 400 musical compositions, the largest among the post-Trinity composers, that included many different types of Varnams as well as Kritis and Thillanas. The songs were on a number of the Hindu pantheon, his patrons. He composed them in four languages – Telugu, Tamil, Sanskrit and Kannada.

Some of the ragams that owe their existence today to this great composer include Vijaysaraswathi, Karnaranjani, Budhamanohari and  Niroshta. He also popularised Shanmukhapriya and Mohanakalyani. When someone asked if he could compose something that would appeal to Westerners, he composed the English notes (later popularised by Madurai Mani Iyer).

In 1934, Muthiah composed music for Tamil Nadu Talkies then owned by S. Soundararaja for their Lavakusa, a film based on the Uttara Ramayana. Bhagavathar initially was very reluctant but was later persuaded by Raval Krishna Iyer, a budding contractor of Madras. Muthiah travelled to Bombay where the film was being made at the Ranjit Studios. He composed 63 songs for the film resulting in the film being renamed as Sangeetha Lavakusa.

Artist
He was adept at playing both the Chitraveena and Mridangam.

In addition to musical talents, his theoretical knowledge was also vast. He wrote a treatise on musical theory, Sangita Kalpa Drumam, and regularly gave lectures on musicology at the Music Academy. He was the first musician to be awarded a doctorate in India when the Kerala University awarded him the D. Litt. for his Tamil treatise in 1943. He was also the first principal of the Swati Tirunal Academy of music started in Trivandrum in 1939. Muthiah Bhagavatar has also authored a Sanskrit poetic work called Tyagaraja Vijaya Kavya. T. N. Seshagopalan, who was taught by Ramanathapuram Sankara Sivam, a disciple of Muthiah Bhagavathar, said "He was also the first to introduce the practice of nagaswara vidwans playing during the puja time at the Thiruvananthapuram temple."

He lived like a great king, but was as magnanimous as he was rich. The Harikesanjali Trust (promoted by his descendants) has been established to propagate his compositions.

Awards and recognitions
Having impressed the Maharaja of Mysore, he was appointed court musician at Mysore. He was patronized by the Maharaja of Mysore Krishna Raja Wadiyar IV. At Mysore he composed 115 kritis in Kannada in praise of Goddess Chamundeshwari, the patron goddess of the Wodeyar dynasty. Later he was invited to the court of Travancore by the Maharaja Mulam Tirunal where he studied Swatitirunal kritis and wrote the book Sangeeta Kalpadruma, which won him an honorary doctorate. Muthiah Bhagavathar was the first President of the Annual Conference at the Madras Music Academy and was awarded the most prestigious award in Carnatic music, Sangeetha Kalanidhi title in 1930. He was conferred with an honorary doctorate by University of Kerala in 1942.

Legacy
When he died in 1945, Muthiah Bhagavatar had written over 400 kritis and changed the entire landscape of Carnatic music by introducing many Hindustani ragas (for example "Sohini" which is Hamsaanandhi in carnatic and Saarang Malhar) and creating approximately 20 new ragas of his own. He ensured that his legacy would live on with such compositions as Bhuvanesvariya and also through his disciples, the most famous of which was Madurai Mani Iyer.

Muthiah Bhagavatar's legacy of music lives on in his granddaughter, veena expert Smt. Rugmini Gopalakrishnan.

Compositions

In his mother tongue (Tamil) Composition

Annai Makali,       Raagam : Kapi,       Adi tALaM

Andavan Darishname  Raagam : Jonpuri,    Adi tALaM

Unnai ninaindu      Raagam : Ragamalika,  Adi tALaM

Varnams

Chamundamba ashtottara shatanama Krithis

Other Krithis

See also 
 List of Carnatic composers

Notes

External links 
 
 
 Basic Info
 Detailed Biographical Information
 Articles on Muthiah Bhagavatar
  - He sings in his own voice

1877 births
1945 deaths
Carnatic composers
Mridangam players
Sangeetha Kalanidhi recipients
20th-century Indian musicians
20th-century drummers
Harikatha exponents
Musicians in British India